In archaic usage, the vapours (or vapors) is a mental, psychical, or physical state, such as hysteria, mania, clinical depression, bipolar disorder, lightheadedness, fainting, flush, withdrawal syndrome, mood swings, or PMS in which a sufferer loses mental focus. Ascribed primarily to women and thought to be caused by internal emanations (vapours) from the womb, it was related to the concept of female hysteria. The word "vapours" was subsequently used to describe a depressed or hysterical nervous condition.

Over 4000 years of history, this condition was considered from two perspectives: scientific and demonological. It was treated with herbs, sex or sexual abstinence, punished and purified with fire for its association with sorcery and finally, clinically studied as a disease and treated with innovative therapies. However, even at the end of 19th century, scientific innovation had still not reached some places, where the only known therapies were those proposed by Galen. The evolution of these diseases seems to be a factor linked with social "westernization", and examining under what conditions the symptoms first became common in different societies became a priority for recent studies over risk factor.

Today, the phrase "a case of the vapours" is most often used either melodramatically or for comedic effect.

Victorian era
Before the Victorian era, a variety of conditions which affected women were referred to as "a case of the vapours". A Treatise of Vapours or Hysterick Fits, by John Purcell, published in 1707, describes the various conditions described as "vapours", with treatments.

A description of someone having "a case of the vapours" was sometimes used for a person in a state of emotional agitation.

See also
Smelling salts

References

External links
A Nasty Case of the Vapours at BBC Radio 4

Obsolete medical terms
Obsolete terms for mental disorders